Robert Wilson Hamilton (1819 – 9 August 1904) was an American-born lawyer and judge who was the inaugural Attorney General of Fiji. He served on the courts of the state of Illinois and later practiced law in California. During a business trip to Fiji in 1872, King Seru Epenisa Cakobau persuaded him to remain and take up the newly created position of Attorney General. He served until Charles Rossiter Forwood replaced him later that year.

Hamilton married Isabella Eliza Hart at Lapeer, Michigan, on 1 October 1858. They had one son, Alvin Nelson, born 14 October 1859. Hamilton died in Poughkeepsie, New York.

|-

References

American judges
American expatriates in Fiji
Attorneys-general of Fiji
People from Illinois
Politicians from Poughkeepsie, New York
1819 births
1904 deaths
Ethnic minority Fijian politicians
19th-century American judges